The women's 200 metre butterfly competition at the 2022 Mediterranean Games was held on 1 July 2022 at the Aquatic Center of the Olympic Complex in Bir El Djir.

Records
Prior to this competition, the existing world and Mediterranean Games records were as follows:

Results

Heats
The heats were started at 11:05.

Final 
The final was held at 19:03.

References

Women's 200 metre butterfly
2022 in women's swimming